The Infosys Prize is an annual award given to scientists, researchers, engineers and social scientists of Indian origin (not necessarily born in India) by the Infosys Science Foundation and ranks among the highest monetary awards in India to recognize research.

References

Infosys